Shiju Kataria (born 27 May) is an Indian television actress and producer known for portraying Smriti in StarPlus's Behenein. As of August 2021, she is portraying Sejal Anjaaria in Colors TV's Balika Vadhu 2.

Early life and career

Shiju Kataria was born on 27 May to Naresh Kataria and Kavita Kataria in Fazilka, Punjab. She completed her schooling from Army Public School, Fazilka. She shifted to Chandigarh for higher studies. Shiju graduated from Punjab University (Chandigarh). In 2002, she shifted to Mumbai to pursue her career in acting. She is best known for her role in StarPlus' serial Behenein. Her hard-work was recognized by Gulzar Sahib who chose her as a lead in two movies. She played lead role in the movie Teen Behne. She also starred in the movie Das Tola.

Shiju has starred in almost 70 serials. From 2014 to 2017, she appeared in Behenein on star plus, Pyaar Tune Kya Kiya (TV series), Santoshi Maa (TV series), Aahat, Savdhaan India, Mohi- Ek Khwab Ke Khilne Ki Kahani, Angrezi mein kehte hain (ndtv imagine), crime patrol, cid, savdhaan india, kashmkash zindgi ki etc

Television

Films

References

 Bigg-Boss winner Ashutosh-Kaushik and Shiju-Kataria to feature in an episode of Savdhaan India Mumbai Fights 
  
 Vineet Raina and Shiju-Kataria in Fear Files
  
 Shiju Kataria bags Savdhaan India and Crime Patrol
  
 Tv actress shiju kataria becomes a film producer with annie maane
  
 Shiju Kataria profile
   
 Triple bonanza for Shiju Kataria
   
 Shiju Kataria IMDB Profile
 
 Triple bonanza for Shiju Kataria
 
 Kundan Shah back with Teen Behenein
https://www.tellychakkar.com/tv/tv-news/exclusive-sejal-aka-shiju-kataria-has-quit-colors-balika-vadhu-2-reason-inside-211124

External links
  
 
https://www.instagram.com/shijukataria/

Living people
21st-century Indian actresses
Indian television actresses
Actresses in Hindi television
1990 births